The 2008 United States House of Representatives elections in California were held on November 4, 2008 to determine who would represent California various congressional districts in the United States House of Representatives. In the 111th Congress, California has 53 seats in the House, apportioned accordingly after the 2000 United States Census. Representatives are elected to two-year terms; those elected will serve in the 111th Congress from January 3, 2009 to January 3, 2011. The election coincides with the United States presidential election as well as other elections in California.

According to CQ Politics, the districts considered the most competitive were the 4th and 11th, with the 3rd, 8th, 26th, 46th and 50th as less than safe as well. However, the partisan balance of the state's congressional delegation did not change, despite the strong Democratic dominance during the broader elections.

Overview

Results
Below are the final official results as reported by the Secretary of State.

District 1 
 (map)
Race ranking and details from CQ Politics
Campaign contributions from OpenSecrets

District 2 
 (map)
Race ranking and details from CQ Politics
Campaign contributions from OpenSecrets

District 3 
 (map)
Race ranking and details from CQ Politics
Campaign contributions from OpenSecrets

District 4
 (map)
California’s 4th District (New Rating: No Clear Favorite. Previous Rating: Leans Republican) from CQ Politics
Campaign contributions from OpenSecrets

On December 2, 2008, Republican Tom McClintock declared victory over Democrat Charlie Brown in the race in the 4th congressional district. Brown conceded his defeat the next day.  The race had been so close that it took four weeks of counting all mailed and provisional ballots before McClintock could be assured of victory.

CQ Politics had forecast the race in this traditionally Republican district as 'No Clear Favorite'. Two polls sponsored by Brown showed Brown in the lead; two polls sponsored by McClintock showed McClintock in the lead.

Charlie Brown is a retired Air Force officer who first ran for this seat in 2006, losing to incumbent John Doolittle by three percent of the vote. Brown announced in February 2007 that he would run again in 2008. Doolittle's prospects for reelection suffered because of a federal investigation into his alleged ties to Jack Abramoff. In April 2007, the FBI raided Doolittle's Virginia home. Doolittle denies all wrongdoing, and has not been charged with any crime. On January 10, 2008, Doolittle announced that he would finish his term but not run for re-election.

On March 4, 2008, State Senator Tom McClintock of Thousand Oaks officially launched his campaign for this district at the Placer County Courthouse in Auburn. McClintock received immediate endorsements from local and state Republicans, including State Senator Sam Aanasted, State Assemblyman Ted Gaines, State Assemblyman Rick Keene, Auburn City Councilman Kevin Hanley, Yuba County Supervisor Dan Logue, and Nevada County Supervisor Sue Horne.

Brown was endorsed by Senator Max Cleland, former General Wesley Clark, former Republican Congressman Pete McCloskey, Senator Jim Webb of Virginia, and many veterans' groups including the Veterans' Alliance for Security and Democracy and VoteVets.org.

In the primary election on June 3, 2008, Tom McClintock won the Republican primary with 54% of the vote ahead of Doug Ose, Suzanne Jones, and Theodore Terbolizard, in that order. Other Republican candidates had withdrawn from the race and thus did not appear on the ballot, including Rico Oller, Eric Egland, and Auburn City Councilman Mike Holmes.

Charlie Brown won the Democratic primary with 88% of the vote, ahead of John "Wolf" Wolfgram, who had little financial support.

District 5 
 (map)
Race ranking and details from CQ Politics
Campaign contributions from OpenSecrets

District 6 
 (map)
Race ranking and details from CQ Politics
Campaign contributions from OpenSecrets

District 7 
 (map)
Race ranking and details from CQ Politics
Campaign contributions from OpenSecrets

District 8 
 (map)
Race ranking and details from CQ Politics
Campaign contributions from OpenSecrets

The eighth congressional district has been represented by Democrat Nancy Pelosi since 1993, when the area was redistricted from the 5th congressional district. Pelosi, who is Speaker of the House, is considered safe for re-election, but Iraq War activist Cindy Sheehan announced that she would consider running against Pelosi if Pelosi did not put in an article of impeachment against President George W. Bush and Vice President Dick Cheney. She qualified for the ballot as an independent candidate and was endorsed by the Peace and Freedom Party.

District 9 
 (map)
Race ranking and details from CQ Politics
Campaign contributions from OpenSecrets

District 10 
 (map)
Race ranking and details from CQ Politics
Campaign contributions from OpenSecrets

District 11 
 (map)
Race ranking and details from CQ Politics
Campaign contributions from OpenSecrets

District 12 
 (map)
Race ranking and details from CQ Politics
Campaign contributions from OpenSecrets

California's 12th congressional district is represented by Democrat Jackie Speier. She won a special election months before the general election to replace Tom Lantos, who represented the district from 1981 until his death due to esophageal cancer at the age of 80 in 2008. Lantos had announced that he would not seek re-election due to his declining health. This overwhelmingly Democratic district comprises mainly northern San Mateo County and the Sunset area of San Francisco.

District 13 
 (map)
Race ranking and details from CQ Politics
Campaign contributions from OpenSecrets

California's 13th congressional district has been represented by Democrat Pete Stark since 1973. Often regarded as the most liberal member of Congress (and its only atheist), Stark ran for re-election and was unopposed for the Democratic nomination. His overwhelmingly Democratic district is centered in the East Bay and includes Hayward.

District 14
 (map)
Race ranking and details from CQ Politics
Campaign contributions from OpenSecrets

District 15 
 (map)
Race ranking and details from CQ Politics
Campaign contributions from OpenSecrets

District 16 
 (map)
Race ranking and details from CQ Politics
Campaign contributions from OpenSecrets

District 17 
 (map)
Race ranking and details from CQ Politics
Campaign contributions from OpenSecrets

District 18
 (map)
Race ranking and details from CQ Politics
Campaign contributions from OpenSecrets

District 19
 (map)
Race ranking and details from CQ Politics
Campaign contributions from OpenSecrets

District 20
 (map)
Race ranking and details from CQ Politics
Campaign contributions from OpenSecrets

District 21
 (map)
Race ranking and details from CQ Politics
Campaign contributions from OpenSecrets

District 22
 (map)
Race ranking and details from CQ Politics
Campaign contributions from OpenSecrets

District 23
 (map)
Race ranking and details from CQ Politics
Campaign contributions from OpenSecrets

District 24
 (map)
 has been represented by Republican Elton Gallegly since 1987.  Although he had claimed that his 2006 campaign would be his last, Gallegly has announced that he intends to seek another term in 2008. Republican State Senator Tom McClintock, who has name statewide recognition from his several statewide campaigns, would have considered the likely frontrunner were there an open seat but moved to an open seat in Northern California's 4th District in 2008. McClintock had been an intra-party rival to Gallegly, who had hoped to have a political ally nominated to succeed him. Bush won 55% here in 2004.
Race ranking and details from CQ Politics
Campaign contributions from OpenSecrets

District 25
 (map)
Race ranking and details from CQ Politics
Campaign contributions from OpenSecrets

District 26
 (map)
Race ranking and details from CQ Politics
Campaign contributions from OpenSecrets
Dreier (R-i) vs Warner (D) graph of collected poll results from Pollster.com

District 27
 (map)
Race ranking and details from CQ Politics
Campaign contributions from OpenSecrets

District 28
 (map)
Race ranking and details from CQ Politics
Campaign contributions from OpenSecrets

District 29
 (map)
Race ranking and details from CQ Politics
Campaign contributions from OpenSecrets

District 30
 (map)
Race ranking and details from CQ Politics
Campaign contributions from OpenSecrets

District 31
 (map)
Race ranking and details from CQ Politics
Campaign contributions from OpenSecrets

District 32
 (map)
Race ranking and details from CQ Politics
Campaign contributions from OpenSecrets

District 33
 (map)
Race ranking and details from CQ Politics
Campaign contributions from OpenSecrets

District 34
 (map)
Race ranking and details from CQ Politics
Campaign contributions from OpenSecrets

District 35
 (map)
Race ranking and details from CQ Politics
Campaign contributions from OpenSecrets

District 36
 (map)
Race ranking and details from CQ Politics
Campaign contributions from OpenSecrets

District 37
 (map)
This district has been represented by Democrat Laura Richardson since winning a special election on August 21, 2007 that was called after Democrat Juanita Millender-McDonald died of cancer. The staunchly Democratic district includes Compton, some of south-central Los Angeles and much of Long Beach.
Race ranking and details from CQ Politics
Campaign contributions from OpenSecrets

District 38
 (map)

California's 38th congressional district has been represented by Democrat Grace Napolitano since 1999. Napolitano's heavily Democratic east Los Angeles-based district is a largely Hispanic one that includes Montebello, Pico Rivera, La Puente, and part of Norwalk.
Race ranking and details from CQ Politics
Campaign contributions from OpenSecrets

District 39
 (map)
Race ranking and details from CQ Politics
Campaign contributions from OpenSecrets

District 40
 (map)
Race ranking and details from CQ Politics
Campaign contributions from OpenSecrets

District 41
 (map)

California's 41st congressional district has been represented by Republican Jerry Lewis since 1979. Lewis served as the chair of the House Appropriations Committee when Republicans controlled the House. Lewis, who will be 74 in 2008, has come under investigation for connections to the Copeland Lowery lobbying firm. In spite of speculation that he would retire, Lewis announced he would seek reelection on August 31. Bush won 62% here in 2004.
Race ranking and details from CQ Politics
Campaign contributions from OpenSecrets

District 42
 (map)

California's 42nd congressional district is one of the most conservative districts in the state, and has been represented by Republican Gary Miller since 1999. Before the election, Miller suffered bad press, with four ex-aides accusing him of conflict-of-interest and using his position to profit from the sale of personal land holdings.
Race ranking and details from CQ Politics
Campaign contributions from OpenSecrets

District 43
 (map) 
Race ranking and details from CQ Politics
Campaign contributions from OpenSecrets

District 44
 (map)
Race ranking and details from CQ Politics
Campaign contributions from OpenSecrets

District 45
 (map)
Race ranking and details from CQ Politics
Campaign contributions from OpenSecrets

District 46
 (map)
Republican Dana Rohrabacher's district (which includes the Southern Channel Islands, Palos Verdes Peninsula, and parts of Orange County) has been a Republican stronghold in recent years. Huntington Beach mayor Debbie Cook was the (Democratic) challenger.
Race ranking and details from CQ Politics
Campaign contributions from OpenSecrets

District 47
 (map)
 was represented by Democrat Loretta Sanchez since 1997. Sanchez won 62% of the vote in a district that barely went to George W. Bush with around 50% to 49% in 2004, which could have resulted in an opening for Republicans, who had not recruited a strong candidate in years. This year, Republican Rosie Avila hoped to oust Sanchez. However, Sanchez's district is located in one of the more Democratic areas of Orange County, including Anaheim and Santa Ana, and Al Gore won this district in 2000 by a comfortable margin.
Race ranking and details from CQ Politics
Campaign contributions from OpenSecrets

District 48
 (map)
Race ranking and details from CQ Politics
Campaign contributions from OpenSecrets

District 49
 (map)
Race ranking and details from CQ Politics
Campaign contributions from OpenSecrets

District 50
 (map)
 has been represented by Republican Brian Bilbray since 2006. Bilbray won 53% of the vote in a Republican-leaning district north of San Diego that was previously represented by the scandal-plagued Duke Cunningham (R). George W. Bush won 54% here in 2004. Nick Leibham won against Cheryl Ede in the Democratic primary. CQ Politics forecasts the race as 'Safe Republican'.
Race ranking and details from CQ Politics
Campaign contributions from OpenSecrets
Bilbray (R-i) vs Leibham (D) graph of collected poll results from Pollster.com

District 51
 (map)
The congressional district has been held by Bob Filner, who formerly represented the 50th, since its inception following the 1992 redistricting. The district was redrawn following the 2000 Census, creating a gerrymandered district boundary. Democratic incumbent Bob Filner of San Diego is seeking reelection and is being challenged by Republican businessman David Lee Joy of Spring Valley. The Libertarian candidate is musician and software systems engineer Dan "Frodo" Litwin of San Diego.
Race ranking and details from CQ Politics
Campaign contributions from OpenSecrets

District 52
 (map)
This race is for an open seat, being vacated by former Republican presidential candidate Duncan Hunter. Both Democratic and Republican candidates are OIF veterans.  The Libertarian candidate is 2002 congressional candidate Mike Benoit.
Race ranking and details from CQ Politics
Campaign contributions from OpenSecrets

District 53
 (map)
Race ranking and details from CQ Politics
Campaign contributions from OpenSecrets

References

External links 
U.S. Congress candidates for California at Project Vote Smart
California U.S. House Races from 2008 Race Tracker
Campaign contributions for California congressional races from OpenSecrets

2008
California
United States House of Representatives